The 1972–73 Carolina Cougars season was the 4th season of the Cougars in the American Basketball Association. The Cougars finished 2nd in points per game with 115.6 points per game and 5th in points allowed with 110.7 points per game. By the time the season was half over, the team was 28–14, with a season best eleven game winning streak occurring during that span, while they went 29–13 in the second half. The biggest losing streak was 4, which occurred after they had already won over 50 games. They clinched the best record in the Eastern Division after beating the San Diego Conquistadors on March 25, 1973, with their 57th victory, is tied for 9th most by a team in one ABA season. In the playoffs, they beat the New York Nets in five games to go to the Division Finals with a chance to go to the ABA Finals. But the Cougars failed to advance, losing to the Kentucky Colonels in seven games, with the final one in their home court.

During the regular season, the Cougars played 28 games in Greensboro, 13 in Charlotte, and 2 in Raleigh; in the playoffs, the team played 4 games in Greensboro, 2 in Charlotte, and one in Raleigh.

Roster 
 54 Roger Brown - Center
 27 Joe Caldwell - Small forward 
 20 Mack Calvin - Point guard
 32 Billy Cunningham - Power forward
 33 Ira Harge - Center
 21 Steve Jones - Shooting guard
 42 Mike Lewis - Center
 23 Gene Littles - Point guard
 22 Ed Manning - Power forward
 24 Ted McClain - Shooting guard
 52 Tom Owens - Center
 14 Steve Previs - Point guard
 21 Bob Warren - Shooting guard
 44 Dennis Wuycik - Small forward

Final standings

Eastern Division

Playoffs
Eastern Division Semifinals

Cougars win series, 4–1

Eastern Division Finals vs. Kentucky Colonels

Cougars lose series, 4–3

Awards and honors
1973 ABA All-Star Game selections (game played on February 6, 1973)
 Mack Calvin
 Joe Caldwell
 Billy Cunningham
ABA Most Valuable Player: Billy Cunningham (24.1 points per game, 12 rebounds per game, and 6.3 assists per game) 
ABA Coach of the Year: Larry Brown
ABA Executive of the Year: Carl Scheer
All-ABA First Team selection: Billy Cunningham
All-ABA Second Team selection: Mack Calvin
All-Defensive Team selection: Joe Caldwell
All-Rookie Team selection: Dennis Wuycik

References

 Cougars on Basketball Reference

External links
 RememberTheABA.com 1972-73 regular season and playoff results
 RememberTheABA.com Carolina Cougars page

Carolina Cougars
Carolina
Carolina Cougars, 1972-73
Carolina Cougars, 1972-73